Laura Gauché (born 4 March 1995) is a French World Cup alpine ski racer and specializes in the speed events of downhill and super-G. She made her World Cup debut in January 2014 and has competed in two Winter Olympics and two World Championships.

Career 

At the Winter Olympics in 2018, Gauché finished 22nd in the downhill and twelfth in the combined.

Her first World Cup podium came in February 2023 in a downhill at Crans-Montana, Switzerland.

Personal life
Born in Moûtiers, Savoie, Gauché was a student at Middle School Saint Exupery in Bourg-Saint-Maurice, France, and attended High School Jean Moulin in Albertville. In 2017, she obtained a two-year diploma in marketing techniques from Annecy University Institutes of Technology.

World Cup results

Season standings

Top ten finishes
 0 wins
 1 podium (1 DH); 6 top tens (4 SG, 2 DH)

World Championship results

Olympic results

References

External links

1995 births
Living people
French female alpine skiers
Alpine skiers at the 2018 Winter Olympics
Alpine skiers at the 2022 Winter Olympics
Olympic alpine skiers of France
Université Savoie-Mont Blanc alumni
Sportspeople from Savoie
21st-century French women